"Heaven Knows" is a song  performed by American contemporary R&B singer Lalah Hathaway, issued as the first single from her eponymous debut studio album. The song peaked at #3 on the Billboard R&B chart in 1990.

Chart positions

Weekly charts

Year-end charts

References

External links
 
 

1990 songs
1990 singles
Lalah Hathaway songs
Virgin Records singles